The WSL Fighting World Championship, also known as the WSL World Fighting Championship, was a secondary championship in the Wrestling Superstars Live (WSL) promotion. It replaced the AWA Superstars of Wrestling United States Championship as the organization's secondary singles title on March 29, 2008.

Title history

See also
AWA Superstars of Wrestling United States Championship
Zero-One United States Heavyweight Championship

External links
wrestlingsuperstarslive.com

Wrestling Superstars Live
World professional wrestling championships